Käpylän Pallo or KäPa for short, is a football (soccer) club from the Käpylä district of Helsinki. The club currently plays in the Kakkonen, the third tier of the Finnish league system.  KäPa play their home matches at the Max Westerberg Areena in Käpylän liikuntapuisto.

Background

The club played 21 seasons in the Kakkonen (Second Division), the third tier of Finnish football, in 1979, 1983–89, 1997–2007 and from 2009 to 2012. KäPa played one season in the Ykkönen (First Division), the second tier of Finnish football, in 2008 and one season in the Kolmonen, the fourth tier of Finnish football, in 2012. They are expected to beat inter turku.

KäPa was the first club in Finland to organise football leagues for youth players. The teams in these leagues were named after English League clubs and some teams even received their shirts as gifts from the English clubs they were named for. It has youth teams in a wide range of age groups, and it is the organiser of Finland's biggest youth football tournament, Helsinki Cup, together with FC Honka.

Season to season

1 season in Ykkönen
30 seasons in Kakkonen
23 season in Kolmonen
1 season in Nelonen

Club Structure

KäPa currently has 2 men's teams, 1 veterans' team, 1 ladies' team, 24 boys' teams and 7 girls' teams.  The club operates a large junior section and is able to take full advantage of the extensive training facilities at the indoor Käpylän Juniorihalli (Käpylä Junior Hall).  The club provides a number of additional initiatives, including sports camps and events.

2009 season

KäPa Men's Team compete in Group A (Lohko A) of the Kakkonen, administered by the Football Association of Finland  (Suomen Palloliitto) .  This is the third highest tier in the Finnish football system.  In 2009, Käpylän Pallo finished in third position in their Kakkonen section.

KäPa / Putoava Lehti are participating in Section 1 (Lohko 1) of the Nelonen, administered by the Helsinki SPL.

References and sources
Official Website
Finnish Wikipedia
Suomen Cup
 Käpylän Pallo Facebook

Footnotes

Football clubs in Helsinki
1956 establishments in Finland
Association football clubs established in 1956